Victoria is the capital and largest city of the Republic of Seychelles, situated on the north-eastern side of Mahé island, the archipelago's main island. The city was first established as the seat of the British colonial government. In 2010, the population of Greater Victoria (including the suburbs) was 26,450 (26.66%) out of the country's total population of 99,202.

History
The area that would become Victoria was originally settled in 1778 by French colonists after they claimed the island in 1756. The town was called L'Établissement until 1841 when it was renamed to Victoria by the British, after Queen Victoria.

Economy 
Tourism is an important sector of the economy. The principal exports of Victoria are vanilla, coconuts, coconut oil, fish and guano.

Education 
The Mont Fleuri campus of the University of Seychelles is in Victoria.

Culture 

Attractions in the city include a clocktower modelled on Little Ben in London, the courthouse, the Botanical Gardens, the National Museum of History, the Natural History Museum and the Sir Selwyn Selwyn-Clarke Market. Victoria Market and the brightly coloured fish and fruit markets is the local hot spot for the Seychellois people.

Places of worship 

There are two cathedrals in Victoria, Immaculate Conception Cathedral (Roman Catholic) and St Paul's Cathedral (Anglican). There are also Baptist and Pentecostal churches, mosques and Hindu temples.

Sports 
Stade Linité, the national stadium, is in Victoria. It is mostly used for football matches.

Transport 
Victoria is served by Seychelles International Airport, completed in 1971. The inner harbour lies immediately east of the town, where tuna fishing and canning is a major industry. One of the largest bridges in Victoria was destroyed by tsunami waves from the 2004 Indian Ocean earthquake.

Districts
Four of the districts of Seychelles are in Victoria.
Greater Victoria
English River (La Rivière Anglaise), the central district
Saint Louis
Mont Fleuri
Bel Air

Twin towns and sister cities
Victoria is twinned with:

Climate
Victoria features a tropical rainforest climate (Köppen climate classification Af) with high temperatures throughout the course of the year. The capital does have noticeably wetter and drier periods during the year, with June and July being its driest months and December through February being the city's wettest months. However, since in no month does the average monthly precipitation falls below  in Victoria, the city does not have a true dry season month. This lack of a true dry season month is a primary reason why the climate falls under the tropical rainforest climate category. Although being very rainy, skies are usually clear to partly clear and completely cloudy days remain scarce throughout the year even during the rainiest months.

See also
Romainville Island, Seychelles

References

External links

 
Ports and harbours of the Indian Ocean
Capitals in Africa
1770s establishments in Africa
Populated places established in 1778